General elections were held in Thailand on 10 February 1969. The result was a victory for the military-backed United Thai People's Party, which won 75 of the 219 seats in the House of Representatives. Voter turnout was 49.2%. Following the election, 30 of the 72 independents joined the UTPP, giving it a total of 105 seats, whilst 24 formed the Liberal Independent Party.

Results

References

Thailand
1969 elections in Thailand
Elections in Thailand
Election and referendum articles with incomplete results
February 1969 events in Thailand